Wildwood Lake is a natural lake located in Suffolk County on Long Island in Northampton near Riverhead, New York, United States. The lake was formed by glaciers during the last Ice age. There is a variety of fish species present in the lake, including:
 Largemouth Bass
 Chain Pickerel
 Pumpkinseed
 Yellow Perch
 White Perch
 Brown bullhead
 Rock Bass

The lake is also stocked with Trout by the Town of Southampton.

Fishing in Wildwood Lake is limited to Southampton residents or persons accompanied by a resident guide only. There is a state DEC access ramp for small hand- or electric-powered craft, but fishing is limited, as stated above.

It is said that there was once a road crossing through the middle of the lake, but it has never been proven.

References

External links
NYS DEC Wildwood Lake Map with Captions
NYS DEC Wildwood Lake Website

Lakes of New York (state)
Southampton (town), New York
Lakes of Suffolk County, New York